Korean indie, referring to independent music in South Korea, developed in the 1990s in Hongdae, an area of Northwestern Seoul. It is widely regarded as the counterpart to K-pop; whereas K-pop is characterized by a commercialized image targeting a specific audience, Korean indie emphasizes the authentic messages of musicians.

Background 

South Korea's first modern wave of indie music began after the end of the military regime in 1987, coinciding with the rise of South Korea's popular culture during the early to mid-1990s. While experienced rock musicians tried to revive their musical careers, the younger generation developed a new punk and rock community in the Hongdae area of Seoul. New artists from this era include the bands Crying Nut, Pippi Band, and Seo Taiji and Boys. As a punk rock group, Crying Nut was formed in 1993 and is “Korea's most successful indie band”, selling over 100,000 copies of their debut album in 1998. Pippi Band was an unconventional indie grunge band that debuted in 1995 with a lead singer who dressed and acted in a unique manner. Seo Taiji and Boys, despite their mainstream success, is still considered a part of innovative Korean indie of the time because they were a self-produced and self-promoted group.

Korean culture, including the music industry, was notably changed after the 1997 Asian Financial Crisis. It was a difficult time for South Korean indie music; economic slowdown, the development of digital music, and increased incidences of piracy all meant fewer CD sales for artists. The gentrification of Hongdae in the mid-2000s also contributed to the end the first wave of Korean indie music. Another factor in the fall of the first wave was an incident on an MBC television program, Live Music Camp, in 2005. During a live performance by a South Korean punk rock band, Rux, two men from another indie band, Couch, stripped nude and exposed themselves on national television. This incident negatively impacted public opinion of both the ongoing indie music scene and MBC.

After the late 2000s, alongside the Korean wave, came a second wave of Korean indie, with notable bands including Kiha & the Faces, Broccoli, You Too?, and 9 and the Numbers. Kiha & The Faces were able to connect with a new audience thanks to their 2008 hit single, "Ssaguryeo Keopi" (English: Cheap Coffee). Another successful band was Broccoli, You Too?, an authentic indie pop band that gained popularity through their first album No More Encore, released in 2008. An indie rock group influenced by retro sounds, 9 and the Numbers, was also successful with their eponymous debut album in late 2009.

By the time the second wave occurred, indie music in South Korea had become more diverse compared to its rock-dominated past. Mellow, acoustic sounds began to gain popularity. Due to globalization, young rock groups started incorporating English lyrics into their music, in contrast with the former nationalistic era, when musicians were accused of copying Western-style music.

Although Korean indie is often considered subculture, influence from mass and viral media has made the internet the primary platform for indie music, giving individuals who wish to create music an easy opportunity to do so while also providing them a chance for viral success. Additionally, more financial support is being given to indie musicians in the form of concerts and festivals hosted by large corporations. Korean indie has also spread to other countries; Jambinai, the most successful overseas Korean indie band, and an increasing number of other indie groups have been performing abroad in locations such as Asia, Europe, and North America.

Local scenes

Shinchon 
Until commercialization in the 1990s, underground music and student culture thrived in Sinchon, a university district in Seoul, during the 1970s and 1980s.

Hongdae 

Situated in northwestern Seoul, Hongdae is home to a vibrant and diverse indie music culture and to Hongik University, an institution with a prestigious art program. Having developed as the center of subculture since the 1990s, cheap rent enabled the establishment of numerous underground clubs, live music venues, record stores, and studios, gathering talented indie musicians. Groups such as Crying Nut and No Brain are both indie bands that gained fame from a small club in Hongdae called Spot. One of the most famous clubs in Hongdae is Drug, which opened in 1994 and established their record label in 1996, having played a crucial part in the underground music scene. Although Hongdae experienced a period of mass gentrification during the mid-2000s economic boom, it remains a significant indie music scene, with over 40 underground clubs, and attracting more than 500 new indie bands each year.

Gwanak 
Gwanak, the working-class area of Southern Seoul, played a crucial role in the development of Korean indie music. It produced talented artists such as Kim Namhun and Change Kiha, both members of Nunco Band. Famous for being the home of the renowned school, Seoul National University, student activism, political protest, and music were key elements of its culture until the 1990s. In the early 2000s, activities such as the campus song movement made Gwanak a center for experimentation in musical styles, including the fusion of folk and rock, a crucial milestone in Korean music history. The indie label Boongaboonga Records (BGBG) was established in 2004 as a result of Gwanak’s music culture.

Music festivals

Labels 

 Antenna (record label)
 Around Us Entertainment
 Baljunso
 Konnect Entertainment
 Music Farm (record label)

Korean indie groups 

 10cm
 Bolbbalgan4
 Busker Busker
 Bye Bye Sea 
 Cheeze
 Cherry Filter
 Coffee Boy
 Crying Nut
 Danpyunsun and the Sailors
 Diealright
 Eastern Sidekick
 From the Airport
 Galaxy Express
 The Geeks
 Glen Check
 Guckkasten
 Hyukoh
 Jannabi
 Jaurim
 Kiha & The Faces
 Kingston Rudieska
 The Koxx
 Love X Stereo
 Loveholics
 Nell
 Nemesis
 No Brain
 Rooftop Moonlight
 Onnine Ibalgwan
 Pia
 Raspberry Field
 The RockTigers
 Rubber Duckie
 Rumble Fish
 Rux
 Shinchireem
 ...Whatever That Means
 Skasucks
 SURL
 Swingz
 Vanilla Unity
 Vrose
 Walking After U
 Wave to Earth
The Rose

See also
Independent music
Music of Korea

References 

1990s in music
Indie music
South Korean styles of music